Mendosoma is a genus of marine ray finned fish belonging to the family Latridae, the trumpeters.

Taxonomy
Mendosoma was first formally described in 1848 by the French zoologist Alphonse Guichenot.

Some authorities consider the genus Mendosoma to be monotypic, but others recognise three species within the genus: 

 Mendosoma caerulescens Guichenot, 1848
 Mendosoma fernandezianum Guichenot 1848
 Mendosoma lineatum Guichenot, 1848

Both M. caerulescens and M. fernandezianum have been considered nomina dubia in the past. 

The generic name, Mendosoma, was created by combining the word méndola, a Spanish name  for the blotched picarel (Spicara maena), and soma meaning "body", referring to the similarity in body shape between M. lineatum and S. maena.

References

Latridae
Ray-finned fish genera
Fish described in 1848
Taxa named by Alphonse Guichenot